Vladimir Borisenko (1928 – 1987) was a Soviet swimmer. He competed in the men's 200 metre breaststroke at the 1952 Summer Olympics.

References

1928 births
1987 deaths
Soviet male swimmers
Olympic swimmers of the Soviet Union
Swimmers at the 1952 Summer Olympics
Place of birth missing
Male breaststroke swimmers